Svein Harberg (born 30 July 1958) is a Norwegian businessman and politician for the Conservative Party. He has served as an member of Parliament for Aust-Agder since 2009, and the Storting’s first Vice President since 2021. He was also mayor of Grimstad from 2003 to 2007.

Political career

Local politics
Harberg was elected mayor of Grimstad following the 2003 local elections. He didn’t seek re-election in 2007.

Parliament
Harberg was elected to the Norwegian Parliament from Aust-Agder in 2009. During the campaign, he notably expressed it was logical to merge the two Agder counties into one. In the Storting, he was member of the Standing Committee on Education, Research and Church Affairs from 2009 to 2023. He was reelected to the Storting for the periods 2013–2017, 2017–2021 and 2021–2025, and was member of the Standing Committee on Family and Cultural Affairs from 2013 to 2017, and the Standing Committee on Scrutiny and Constitutional Affairs from 2017.

He was elected first vice president of the Storting following the 2021 election. He became acting president of the Storting following Eva Kristin Hansen's resignation following the start of a police investigation into several MPs in a parliamentary housing scandal. He also expressed that the Labour Party should be the ones to find a successor to Hansen.

Personal life

Harberg was born in Bergen on 30 July 1958, a son of Lars Harberg and Odlaug Møkkelgjerd.

Harberg is married, and has four children with his wife.

References

External links

1958 births
Living people
Businesspeople from Bergen
Members of the Storting
Mayors of places in Aust-Agder
Conservative Party (Norway) politicians
21st-century Norwegian politicians